This was a new event of the WTA 125K series.

Zhang Shuai won the tournament after Ayumi Morita had to retire with an injured left hamstring having lost the first set 6–4.

Seeds

Draw

Finals

Top half

Bottom half

References 
 Main draw
 Qualifying draw

Nanjing Ladies Open - Singles
Nanjing Ladies Open